Hurlford (Scottish Gaelic: Baile Àtha Cliath) is a village in East Ayrshire, Scotland.  It has a population of 4,968. Hurlford's former names include Whirlford and Hurdleford. The village was named Whirlford as a result of a ford crossing the River Irvine east of Hurlford Cross, near Shawhill. It shares its name in Gaelic, Baile Àtha Cliath ("The Ford of the Hurdles") with the Irish capital Dublin. The census locality is called Hurlford and Crookedholm.

The village's Blair Park is home to Hurlford United F.C. and many notable footballers have been trained there.

Local Council Wards
The village is mostly contained in the Kilmarnock East and Hurlford ward of East Ayrshire Council while some outlying hamlets are in the Irvine Valley ward.

Religion
Traditionally part of Riccarton parish, the village is now a quoad sacra parish in its own right. Hurlford is home to four church buildings—the Hurlford Kirk and Hurlford Church, both in Main Road, Crookedholm and the Mauchline Road Church.

St Paul's Catholic Church is on Galston Road, Gothic style church, designed by architect Robert Samson Ingram and dates from 1883 and is constructed in yellow brick.

Hurlford Church, the former Free Church built in 1857, is part of the Church of Scotland. Mauchline Road Church was formerly part of the Unitarian Church. It is now used as luxury housing. The Hurlford Kirk, which was the original parish church built in 1875 has also been converted into a house, having become redundant as a church in 1996 when its congregation merged with that of the Free Church.

Education

Hurlford Primary School 
Hurlford Primary School, formerly Hurlford Grammar and Secondary School is the non-denominational primary school for the area and also houses Hurlford Nursery School. The building itself dates back to 1905.

Prince Charles and Camilla, Duchess of Rothesay, visited and congratulated the staff and children on 20 June 2005 on their achievements transforming school meals, which was followed by the school winning the Soil Association's School Food Award at the BBC's Good Food Show, presented by Jamie Oliver.

Crossroads Primary School
Crossroads Primary School, now closed, formerly served the outlying areas of Hurlford and surrounding villages.  It was closed by East Ayrshire Council as it was no longer financially viable to repair the building, despite parental and local protest.  Pupils now attend Galston Primary School.

Economy

The town developed rapidly in the 19th century, following the discovery of coal. Fireclay and ironstone were also worked extensively until production ceased in the 1970s. A poignant reminder of the heyday of the iron and steel industry of Hurlford is the ship's propeller erected at the Cross in the lately redeveloped town centre. Today, industries found in Hurlford include brakepad manufacturing by Eurofriction Limited and whisky production by international company Diageo.

Transport
Hurlford railway station is now closed. Hurlford also used to boast its own tramway system, which connected it to Kilmarnock. Nowadays, the main public transport links are provided by several Stagecoach West Scotland bus services, including direct services to Glasgow.

Notable residents
 Gordon Cree – pianist, composer, conductor, musician and entertainer
 Ross Tollerton – British Army soldier in World War I who was awarded the Victoria Cross
 Robert Dunsmuir – industrialist, politician and developer of coal mines and the E&N Railway on Vancouver Island
 Jimmy Knapp – General Secretary of the RMT transport union
 George Wylie – awarded the George Cross in honour of his attempts to defuse a Nazi bomb which had landed on St Paul's Cathedral in London
 Peter Kirkbride – weightlifter, 2010 Commonwealth Games silver medalist

The village is often referred to as a "football nursery" due to its high output of footballers:
 Ian Bryson – Sheffield United F.C., Barnsley F.C., Preston North End F.C, and Rochdale A.F.C. footballer
 David Calderhead – Queen of the South and Notts County footballer and Chelsea F.C. manager
 William Goldie – Leicester City footballer
 Jack Picken – Manchester United, Bolton Wanderers and Plymouth Argyle footballer
 Andrew Ross – winger in the English Football League for Burnley
 Sandy Turnbull – Manchester City and Manchester United footballer
 Arthur Young – Manchester United footballer
 Jack Young – Kilmarnock and Bristol Rovers footballer
 Colin Douglas – Doncaster Rovers and Rotherham United footballer

See also
 Shawhill Estate, East Ayrshire

References

Villages in East Ayrshire